Umbilibalcis lata is a species of sea snail, a marine gastropod mollusk in the family Eulimidae.

Description 
The maximum recorded shell length is 5.5 mm.

Habitat 
Minimum recorded depth is 183 m. Maximum recorded depth is 183 m.

References

External links

Eulimidae
Gastropods described in 1889